Alan Jilka is an American politician and writer. He is a former three-term Mayor and City Commissioner of Salina, Kansas and a Democratic candidate for the 1st Congressional District of Kansas in the 2010 election.

Education
Jilka is Catholic and of Czech descent He graduated from the University of Notre Dame with a degree in History, and earned an M.A. in Comparative Literature from the University of South Carolina. He completed additional coursework towards a Ph.D in Spanish and Portuguese at Vanderbilt University, studied abroad in Guadalajara, Mexico and Rio De Janeiro, Brazil.

In August of 2017, Jilka earned another Master's Degree, in Personal Financial Planning, from Kansas State University.

Career
Alan Jilka began his political career as a legislative aide to Congressman Dan Glickman (D-KS). He is a writer on various weblogs and newspaper sites such as the Kansas Free Press, focusing on issues of business and politics.

Jilka was a three-term Mayor and City Commissioner of Salina, Kansas, and Democrat Nominee for the 1st Congressional District of Kansas in the U.S. House. He lost the election in 2010 to Tim Huelskamp.

Jilka now works as an Investment Consultant at United Capital.

References

External links
 Official site (Archived)

Living people
Politicians from Salina, Kansas
American people of Czech descent
Mayors of places in Kansas
1962 births
Kansas Democrats